Pseudogalleria is a genus of moths belonging to the subfamily Olethreutinae of the family Tortricidae.

Species
Pseudogalleria inimicella (Zeller, 1872)

See also
List of Tortricidae genera

References

External links
tortricidae.com

Grapholitini
Tortricidae genera